Cyprine is a copper-rich member of the vesuvianite group  with the formula Ca19Cu2+(Al10Mg2)Si18O68(OH)10. A similar name is given to a Cu-bearing variety but not Cu-dominant member within the group. Cyprine (sensu stricto) was discovered in the Wessels mine in the vicinity of Hotazel, Kalahari Manganese Field, South Africa.

Relation to other minerals
Cyprine belongs to the vesuvianite group.

References

Silicate minerals
Copper(II) minerals
Aluminium minerals
Magnesium minerals